Igor Vitalyevich Pimenov (born 1953) is a Latvian Russian politician. He is a member of Harmony and a deputy of the 12th Saeima.

References

External links

Saeima website

1953 births
Living people
Politicians from Riga
Latvian people of Russian descent
New Centre (Latvia) politicians
Social Democratic Party "Harmony" politicians
Deputies of the 9th Saeima
Deputies of the 10th Saeima
Deputies of the 11th Saeima
Deputies of the 12th Saeima
Deputies of the 13th Saeima